Neocollyris bryanti is a species of ground beetle in the genus Neocollyris  in the family Carabidae. It was described by Horn in 1922.

References

Bryanti, Neocollyris
Beetles described in 1922
Taxa named by Walther Horn